Spume Island is a small, low, rocky island lying  southwest of Bonaparte Point, off the southwest coast of Anvers Island in the Palmer Archipelago of Antarctica.
Spume Island was surveyed by the British Naval Hydrographic Survey Unit, 1956–1957. Spume Island was named by the United Kingdom Antarctic Place-names Committee (UK-APC) because heavy seas break over the island in a gale; spume is blown over it.

See also
 Composite Antarctic Gazetteer
 List of Antarctic and sub-Antarctic islands
 List of Antarctic islands south of 60° S
 SCAR
 Territorial claims in Antarctica

References

External links 

Islands of the Palmer Archipelago